Shaukat Aziz (born 6 March 1949) is a Pakistani former banker and financier who served as 17th prime minister of Pakistan from 28 August 2004 to 15 November 2007, as well as the finance minister of Pakistan from 6 November 1999 to 15 November 2007. During his childhood he studied at St Patrick's High School, Karachi. Aziz graduated from the Institute of Business Administration in Karachi, and joined the corporate staff of the CitiBank Pakistan in 1969. He served in various countries' governments as CitiBank financier, and became executive vice-president of Citibank in 1999. After accepting a personal request by General Pervez Musharraf, Aziz returned to Pakistan from the United States to assume charge of the Finance Ministry as its finance minister while taking control of the country's economy. In 2004, Aziz was nominated by the Musharraf loyalist government led by Pakistan Muslim League (Q), to the position of prime minister after the resignation of Zafarullah Khan Jamali on 6 June 2004.

Aziz's macroeconomics policies oversaw political stability and economic progress in Pakistan, subsequently ending the "era of stagflation" in 2001. Intensified privatisation and economic liberalisation programmes were personally initiated by Aziz, privatising state-owned corporations and strengthening the country's economic base, which led to the improvement of the country's growth rate by 6.4% per year. Poverty and inflation rates dropped to 3.5% in the last 3 years, compared to 11–12% in the 1990s. For the first time in Pakistan's history, all goals and revenue collection targets were met in his tenure, and allocation for development increased by about 40%. Moreover, despite a series of internal and external distresses, the economic situation of Pakistan improved significantly and reserves increased to US$10.5 billion on 30 June 2004, compared to US$1.2 billion in October 1999. As prime minister, Aziz oversaw the large-scale expansion of military reforms, police reforms, and significant investment in the country that led to the boom of the automotive industry, energy megaprojects, nuclear industry, and the port industry, and presided over unprecedented GDP growth. Aziz's policy expanded the internet and telecommunication services, and liberalised the private media of Pakistan as his vision to internationalise the image of the country.

Education
Shaukat Aziz was born in Karachi, Sindh Province of Pakistan on 6 March 1949. He studied at Saint Patrick's School, Karachi and Abbottabad Public School, Abbottabad, Pakistan. His father, S.A. Aziz (sometimes Abdul Aziz) was a radio engineer employed in the state-owned Pakistan Broadcasting Corporation (PBC) as chief engineer. His father, S.A. Aziz was noted for making singular contributions in the development of Radio Pakistan and was the architect of its external services; for this his father was conferred with state honours by the government of Pakistan in the 1950s. S.A. Aziz was one of the pioneers who nurtured Radio Pakistan in its days of infancy, and chartered the future roadmap for expansion of its network and technological advancement and growth.

The PBC moved his family to Abbottabad, North West Frontier Province and attended the Abbottabad Public School, and later the family moving back to Karachi. Aziz matriculated and obtained high-school diploma from Saint Patrick's High School and proceeded Government College now GCU In Lahore where he passed his inter-level and ascended to attend the Gordon College of Rawalpindi, Punjab province in 1965. Aziz obtained a BS degree in Economics in 1967 from Gordan College and moved back to Karachi the same year to enroll in a master's programme. Aziz attended the master's programme of the Institute of Business Administration (IBA) in Karachi and obtained MBA in business administration in 1969. While at the IBA, Aziz secured the internship of U.S.-based Citibank, and after his master's degree, Aziz was called to join the executive senior staff of the Citibank, based in the United States.

Career in Citigroup

Initially, Aziz joined the corporate branch of Citibank Pakistan as its credit officer in 1969. During his career, Aziz subsequently served in various countries including Pakistan, Greece, United States, United Kingdom, Malaysia, Philippines, Jordan, Saudi Arabia and Singapore.

After arriving to assume the charge of corporate assignment in the United States, Aziz settled in New York City and took over the office operations of Citibank at the Empire State Building. Aziz acquired permanent residence status, but did not acquire American citizenship, whilst continuing to upgrade his legal status.

In the U.S., Aziz held numerous positions in Citibank across several divisions including Corporate and Investment Banking (CIB), Corporate Planning Officer (CPO), Chief Financial Officer of Citicorp and managing director of Citibank Singapore. He has been a board member of Citibank subsidiaries, including Saudi American Bank, Citicorp Islamic Bank, and of several non-profit organizations. Aziz played a pivotal rôle in expanding Citibank branches and corporate directive operations throughout the country and was instrumental in bringing multinational banking industries into Pakistan in the 1990s.

At Citibank, Aziz served as the corporate director of Asia Pacific global finance operations and had been notable for financing and managing funds on behalf of Citibank and other financial corporations in global stock markets. He was also involved with Citi Private Bank, a subsidiary of Citigroup. Aziz regarded his career in Citigroup as "extremely helpful" in preparing him for the executive public office, in 2006.

Aziz continued to visit Pakistan, working to expand Citibank's financial services and banking, overseeing the wide expansion of Citigroup's branches and its influence in Pakistan. In the 1990s, he worked closely with the governments of Benazir Bhutto and Nawaz Sharif to help negotiate economic relief packages and aid to Pakistan, while maintaining diverse relations with Pakistan's Armed Forces who would also visit the United States as part of Sharif's and Benazir Bhutto's state visits.

By the 1990s, Aziz had established many notable contacts within the United States administration. In a book, Global Financial Warrior, written by John B. Taylor, Aziz had substantial access to the US Treasury, World Bank and many other world financial institutions. Aziz worked closely with the United States in order to finance U.S. war games and operations. Aziz knew the volumes of secretive methods of transferring funds in and out of South Asia, particularly clandestine financing of nuclear weapons programmes of India and Pakistan at its most, Taylor maintained.

Finance Minister

Shaukat Aziz had been a president of Citi Private Bank in New York before returning to Pakistan in 1999. Shortly, General Pervez Musharraf arrived for a small personal trip to the United States after staging a coup d'état to deposed the people-elected prime minister Navaz Sharif on 12 October 1999.

On 26 November 1999, while addressing a gathering of influential lobbyists of the Pakistani American community, a political lobbying sub-body of the Association of Pakistani Physicians of North America (APPNA), Musharraf stated that: "Shaukat Aziz has come to Pakistan with forty other financial experts who have offered free service to revive Pakistan's national economy". After a brief session, Musharraf asked Shaukat Aziz to stand up and introduce himself to the audience.

Aziz reportedly returned with Musharraf in November 1999 and took charge of the Finance ministry as its Finance Minister. Aziz took control of the economy with responsibility for Finance, Economic Affairs, Statistics Division, Planning and Development, and revenue divisions. As Minister of Finance Aziz also headed the Economic Coordination Committee of the Cabinet, the Cabinet Committee on Investment, the executive committee of the National Economic Council, and the Cabinet Committee on Privatization. As Finance minister, all state-owned mega-corporations came under the government-ownership while restructuring each mega-corporation to set off to privatisation. During his first days, Aziz worked to control the economy in a difficult and hostile environment with then-President Muhammad Rafiq Tarar who called him "an alien", and many among those who were close to deposed prime minister Nawaz Sharif and Benazir Bhutto. Other politicians including Fazal-ur-Rehman and Ameen Faheem became hostile towards Aziz and his policies; and harboured grave doubts about him because Aziz was not like a traditional politician in the country, an accredited politician.

Initially there was a decline in the economy, and Aziz attributes this as "state (Pakistan) unpleasant relations with international financial institutions. There was a ~70% decline in the national economy with the loss of $150 million (1999) to $600 million (2000), which constituted 0.21% of foreign direct investment (FDI) global flow. Aziz took initiatives for FDI offering incentives to foreign investors with his macroeconomic policies, taxation framework and a consistent investment policy.

After the 11 September attacks in the United States and Pakistan's role in the War on Terror, Aziz travelled to the United States in order to negotiate a relief and U.S. aid to Pakistan. He closely worked with US Secretary of the Treasury on the detail of the devised plan on how to remove the Taliban from Afghanistan, cancellation and debt relief, loans from the World Bank, and direct support from U.S. Aid for national public development. Aziz recommended policies and new plan of economic reforms, including the improved budgetary transparency and spending controls— a plan that was widely accepted by the United States. With the help from United States Department of the Treasury, Aziz thwarted individuals, difficulties and obstacles to achieve success in his economic programmes. In 2002, Aziz worked with U.S. administration to help advise the United States to finance the war in Afghanistan. In the words of John B. Taylor, Aziz suggested that U.S. should call out for a meeting of finance ministers of the G7 member countries, where the illicit funding of money would become a great problem for G7 countries in the future. In April 2002, Aziz chaired a historical meeting on behalf of Pakistan and the United States, helping the G7 members to understand how the illicit money was transferred was shared with the finance ministers of G7 members and Pakistan on other side.

In 2001, Aziz implemented and activated the Privatization Programme (first founded by former prime minister Nawaz Sharif in 1991) and opened all state-owned enterprises (SOEs) to private sector. This programme undertook the country into rapid economic growth and extreme level of industrialisation the country had for yet seen since 1972. After the 2002 general elections, Aziz intensified his programme and aggressively implemented economic liberalisation policies in the country. Aziz's financial policies came under surrounding controversies, creating new problems for Prime minister Zafarullah Khan Jamali to counter who was forced to resign the office in his favour. His affordable real estate scheme encouraged common men to afford a house and a vehicle on low investment, but on the other hand, this scheme brought an increase violation of zoning regulations in construction companies. Although, Zafarullah Khan Jamali controlled the inflation at its low level, his deregulation policies of price control caused the oil and sugar prices to skyrocket. His public and liberalisation of economy policy expanded the political role of Supreme Court of Pakistan in a higher level of the government and to target high-level of government corruption independently without government interferences.

By October 2007, at the end of Prime Minister Shaukat Aziz's tenure, Pakistan raised back its Foreign Reserves to $16.4 billion. Pakistan's trade deficit was at $13 billion, exports were $18 billion, revenue generation was $13 billion and attracted foreign investment was $8.4 billion.

Pakistan's fiscal performance was praised by IMF and World Bank. The World Bank further reiterated that Pakistan's economic growth bolstered international confidence.

IMF's new South Asia director Mr. George Abed, said he was "very pleased with the record of Pakistan in the past three years of continued macroeconomic and financial stabilisation and we have begun to think of Pakistan as a country of promise and a country of potentially high rate of growth".

The Asian Development Bank also praised Pakistan's Micro-Finance.

In 2001, Mr. Aziz was also named "Finance Minister of the Year" by Euromoney and Bankers magazines.

Assassination attempt

While campaigning on 30 July 2004, Aziz survived an assassination attempt in the Attock District of Punjab, Pakistan. The suicide bomb attack was staged in Fateh Jang, a small town to the north of the capital, Islamabad, where Aziz was contesting an election. The attempt was made when Aziz was departing after meeting with constituents. A suicide bomber, who was travelling with the Aziz motorcade, detonated the device next to the car in which Aziz was travelling, killing himself and Aziz's chauffeur, as well as six others.

Aziz called the incident "tragic," and said it had claimed the lives of innocent people. He added that it had reinforced his resolve to serve Pakistan and the Islamic world. After safely reaching Islamabad, Aziz instigated a probe, while the foreign office contacted its mission in Egypt to try to determine the veracity of an Al Qaeda claim of responsibility. Ten suspected Al-Qaeda perpetrators were arrested in Egypt and later extradited to Pakistan for the crime.

Prime Minister
By 2004, Aziz had become a right hand of general Musharraf, as Musharraf described in his memoirs. The strong oligarch business class of Pakistan, notably Chaudhry Shujaat Hussain, had been impressed by Shaukat Aziz's performance as finance minister. Following the resignation of Mir Zafarullah Khan Jamali on 26 June 2004, Hussain nominated Aziz for the office of prime minister and was also a top choice for the candidacy of prime ministerial post by Musharraf.

However, Aziz was not a member of the National Assembly, although he was a Senator. As required by the constitution, the prime minister had to be a member of the National Assembly. Aziz was highly regarded as a "technocrat" and had gained the trust of the establishment, international institutions and public support. His nomination came after another technocrat-economist, Dr. Manmohan Singh, became the prime minister of India and Aziz was widely seen as compatible with his Indian counterpart.

Having been described and labelled as an urban gentlemen and smartly dressed, Aziz was tasked with day-to-day running of the federal government and see that policies were more effectively executed while Musharraf handled the military issues. In Pakistan, it was also said that Musharraf blindly trusted Aziz and sometimes, Musharraf's approvals were not needed for the projects that normally required permission. Aziz quietly and more quickly undermined the elements seeking to undermine Musharraf which may have been a factor that Musharraf had blindly trusted Aziz.

The post was held by Chaudhry Shujaat Hussain while Aziz fulfilled the constitutional requirement of securing a seat in the lower house of parliament. Aziz ran from two constituencies, Tharparkar-I in Sindh, and Attock District. Even after the assassination attempt, Aziz continued campaigning and won from both constituencies. Since he could retain only one seat, he immediately vacated his Tharparkar seat, preferring to represent Attock, where he had won by 76,156 votes to 29,497.

Election as Prime Minister
Aziz was elected prime minister by parliament on 27 August 2004, by a vote of 191 to 151 in the National Assembly of Pakistan, and was sworn in on 28 August 2004. Pakistan Media labelled him as "Short Cut Aziz" because of lack of political background and hardly affiliation to any political party and still managed to land on the prime ministerial office. Whilst, international media labelled him Urban gentlemen, as he was soft-spoken and greeted his guests with great gesture and manners. He retained his position as Minister of Finance. His government introduced and featured extremely qualified and new faces in the political area of the country, including Hina Rabbani Khar (economic ministry), Hafeez Shaikh (investment ministry), Khurshid Kasuri (Foreign ministry), and Atta ur Rahman (as science adviser). Many of these technocrats ascended to join the successive governments and embark on successful career in the politics thereafter.

Aziz left office on 16 November 2007, at the end of the parliamentary term and became the first prime minister of Pakistan who left seat after completion of parliamentary term of five years.

Domestic reforms

Aziz successfully oversaw the rapid development of the local government system in Pakistan as part of his "Strengthening Decentralisation" program. His domestic initiatives including the decentralisation in the country, and termed the local government system as "more transparent and accountable". Aziz strengthened the policy formats and area of responsibility of National Reconstruction Bureau (NRB) after appointing Daniyal Aziz in 2005. Aziz carried out major reforms in Law enforcement agencies, Police forces, and court system in the country. In 2005, Aziz's government installed 6,000 water supply and sanitation filter plants in entire, through the Khushal Pakistan (lit. Prospered Pakistan) programme, a scheme founded by Nawaz Sharif in the 1990s.
As prime minister, Aziz took hard stance against rivals and took a hardline against his political challengers. Aziz thrashed the Alliance for Restoration of Democracy (ARD) led by conservative leader Javed Hashmi who was placed in military prison on treason charges, on a support provided by Aziz. His hardline and tough counter active measures forced Pakistan Peoples Party of Benazir Bhutto and Pakistan Muslim League-N of Nawaz Sharif to concede their defeat and took asylum in United Kingdom.

In 2005, a non-partisan local government elections were decided to be held in entire country, starting first to hold the elections in Karachi, Sindh Province. Subsequently, Aziz supervised and presided the first free and fair local body elections with PML(Q) and its allied parties sweeping the election arena. Controversially, Aziz allocated Rs. 20 million to each district where PML(Q) candidates lost the National Assembly elections in order to secure its voting bank that was lost in 2002. In Sindh and Balochistan Province, Aziz presided the peaceful election held events and personally monitored the success of the local government body programme. Under his first few of years of government, the law and order situation remains under control and prosperity in Balochistan, and presided the completion the first phase of the Gwadar port.

Problems began to mount with nationalist Akbar Bugti, an ally of Nawaz Sharif. Although, Aziz repeatedly and forcefully denied the knowledge of any military action against Bugti and, as prime minister, Aziz never released any information of any military action in Balochistan. However, Aziz appeared on television screens and stated that "Akbar Bugti died in a military operation during the night of August 25—26, 2008". Aziz was inflicted with the involvement in the killing of Akbar Khan Bugti, although he has denied any involvement in any manner.

In Islamabad alone, Aziz's government was forced to take military action, codename Silence after chairing a meeting with the President. In 2009, Aziz maintained that his government had tried at every level of extreme to resolve the Lal Masjid issue through talks to save lives. In a television interview, Aziz maintained that "We gave them time to leave the mosque and the Imam-e-Kaaba Abdul Rahman Al-Sudais also came to Pakistan on my request in connection with the issue.".

One of the widely reported controversy took place in his government was the atomic proliferation scandal of Abdul Qadeer Khan. Aziz remains supportive towards Khan and efficiently took matters of Abdul Qadeer Khan in 2006 from President Musharraf. On 10 September 2006, Aziz sent flowers and personally visited Khan when he was hospitalised and on 12 October 2007, Musharraf made it clear to United States and rest of the world that Khan "won't be handed over" at given any circumstances. On a television speech, Aziz paid a huge tribute to Abdul Qadeer Khan and while commenting on last part of his speech, Aziz stressed it:

Energy policy

After assuming the office, Aziz announced a controversial "New 25-year energy plan", aiming to raise Pakistan's dependence on imported oil for power generation to 50% by 2030. His government pushed for the renewable energy, and put efforts to established the solar energy and wind power sector in the country.

Prime Minister Aziz's "New 25-year energy plan" remains extremely controversial and met great public criticism by media and energy experts. Energy experts rendered Aziz's programme as "bigger disaster" in a view when even oil rich Gulf countries were reducing their share of oil in their power production. Prime Minister Aziz approved the constructional, and approved the developmental work of CHASNUPP-II reactor at the Chashma Nuclear Power Plant in Chashma city, Punjab Province of Pakistan. A 325 MW commercial nuclear power plant was built with Chinese assistance at the close vicinity of Chashma nuclear power complex. Aziz termed this project as "milestone" in the history of nuclear technology in Pakistan. In 2007, Aziz approved the constructional development of KANUPP-II and the nuclear reprocessing site, the Nuclear Power Fuel Complex in Islamabad. Aziz oversaw to increase the capacity building of the Pakistan Nuclear Regulatory Authority, a governmental nuclear safety authority, to meet the safety requirement of nuclear power plants.
In 2007, Aziz further diversified his nuclear energy policy, terming it as "criteria based nuclear technology" while continued financing the nuclear power projects. Aziz presided initial construction of major hydroelectric power plants project in Pakistan, such as approving the Diamer-Bhasha Dam. Its foundation was laid by his successor Yousaf Raza Gillani in 2011. In 2004, Aziz directed the Ministry of Water and Power and Planning Commission to prepare an integrated energy plan for the country. Aziz approved the "Vision 2025" programme" of Water and Power Development Authority (WAPDA) to produce power through water. The programme was intended to be launched with the help of private sector and private funding through the international megaproject. However all projects were cancelled or either put on hold by the upcoming government of Yousaf Raza Gillani due economic distress, lack of capital and investment and continuing economic declines, leading an increasing circular debt.

Defence reforms
Aziz oversaw the successful development of the JF-17 Thunder fighter programme in record time, built with the close cooperation with China. In 2007, Aziz stressed that "Pakistan is not an offensive country and our defence doctrine is based on having minimum credible deterrence to maintain peace and stability in the region.". Aziz also successfully saw the technology transfer and contract development of first combatant frigate, the F-22P Zulfiquar. In May 2006, Aziz stressed that: "Pakistan's deep military and economic cooperation with China was one not based on "transient interest," but was "higher than Himalayas, deeper than oceans".

In August 2006, Aziz visited the People's Republic of China, seeking Chinese cooperation in space technology. China expressed interest in helping Pakistan with developing and launching satellites. In a joint statement of Prime Minister Shaukat Aziz and Chinese Premier Wen Jiabao, Aziz emphasised that: "both countries are determined to elevate their friendship and strategic partnership.". A contract was signed with China, Aziz authorized the development of the satellite, Paksat-IR. Aziz presided over the security, expansion, and modernization of the country's nuclear deterrence programme as part of his defence policy. Aziz oversaw the successful development of the Shaheen-II missile program and witnessed its first flight at an undisclosed location in April 2006. After witnessing the test, Aziz maintained that: "We will continue to pursue vigorously our security and energy needs from all sources including nuclear.". On 8 August 2005, Aziz issued directives to tightened the security and control and command of the National Command Authority and ordered strict monitoring of atomic assets and facilities at all levels of command.

In 2004, Aziz stated and clarified Pakistan's nuclear policy to the world and India in an interview given to the Times of India:

From 2005 and onwards, Aziz's government took major steps against atomic proliferation while also making several decisions to increase the capacity of nuclear deterrence and sufficient use of nuclear energy for the civil sector.

Foreign relations

On foreign fronts, Aziz closely collaborated with Musharraf while working to develop the geostrategy in the region. Aziz took initiatives to strengthen the relations with the United States, European Union, Russia, India, China, and Saudi Arabia. Under his government, relations with the United States were extremely cordial and friendly. His foreign policy strictly pursued and followed a "Balance Foreign Policy (BFP)" programme with an initial goal to keen to forge robust friendly ties with international community, US and European Union (EU).

Accompanied by Recep Tayyip Erdoğan of Turkey, Aziz travelled to Iran in 2006, and privately told Iranian President Mahmoud Ahmadinejad he must change course regarding its nuclear program, as the current direction was neither in Iran's nor the region's interest. Aziz urged Ahmadinejad to immediately place a moratorium on uranium enrichment, while on the other hand Erdoğan described the EU-3 proposal, with Russian enhancements, as a very attractive offer for Iran. Both Aziz and Erdoğan condemned Ahmedinejad's statements attacking Israel as completely unacceptable and serving no purpose. Aziz's tenure saw considerable improvements in relations with Japan. After visiting Japan, Aziz welcomed investment in the manufacturing sector and Pakistani-Japanese joint ventures in steel manufacturing as an excellent symbol of cooperation in expanding steel production between the two countries.

Aziz paid a farewell visit to South Korea to strengthen and enhance relations between the two countries. Aziz cautiously supported South Korea's stance while refraining to criticise North Korea. On a three-day state visit, Aziz and his counterpart Lee Hae Chan signed two agreements on cultural exchange and providing human resource management, and improving trade and cultural ties between South Korea and Pakistan. Aziz strongly allied with the United States in the fight against terrorism, and in a meeting with an American journalist, Aziz maintained that: "Pakistan is now ideally positioned to "work with cooperation rather than confrontation as a force for peace, stability, and prosperity..". During his tenure, relations with the United States strengthened and progressed. In 2006, Aziz quoted: "Pakistan-American relations are based on mutual trust and respect and are long-standing.". During his repeated visits to the United States, Aziz worked and deliberately approached the U.S. administration on building a strategic partnership with the United States, and made efforts to build a "robust-broad-based strategic relationship.". Aziz's economic, domestic, and internal reforms focused on enriching a longer-term sustainable Pakistan-U.S. relationship and contributed immeasurably to both countries' joint struggle against extremism.

Relations with Israel were considered important by Aziz's government, and supported Musharraf's policy on Israel. At foreign fronts, Aziz maintained a "Telephone Policy" on diplomatic engagement with Israel, whilst keeping Saudi Arabia and Turkey in tacit contact. During his tenure, bilateral relations with the United Kingdom were enhanced and reached to a new level after meeting with British prime minister Tony Blair in 2005, and tightened the economic and defence relations with British counterpart Gordon Brown in 2007. Brown thanked Aziz for the successful launching of a $500 million Eurobond, which was oversubscribed four times. After assuming the office of prime minister, Aziz left for China, as his foreign state visit as prime minister in 2004. In 2007, Aziz made his final state visit as prime minister to China to sign a Free Trade Agreement with China, and regarded the country as a "strategic partner" and a "time-tested friend," whilst China regarded the FTA agreement as "a historic development". Aziz built closer economic ties with India while alleviating the territorial conflicts. After meeting with Indian counterpart Manmohan Singh, a confident measuring building process was initiated by Aziz.

Aziz pushed his foreign policy to Russia, calling Russia a "global super power". In 2006, Aziz invited state-run and private-media of Russia where he repeatedly stressed for the need to enhance cooperation between Pakistan and Russia in the fields of education, science and technology, energy, defence and trade and investment. Finally, in 2007, Russian prime minister Mikhail Fradkov paid a three-day-long visit to Pakistan, becoming the first Russian prime minister and leader to visit the country in 38 years. During this trip, Aziz and Fradkov pledged to boost economic ties and signed two co-operation agreements .

Economic policy

Under Shaukat Aziz's government, the country's national economic growth improved at the rate range by 6.4% to 9.0% a year. All revenue collection targets were met on time for the first time in the history of Pakistan, and allocation for development was increased by about 40%. However, this economic success is attributed largely to debt reduction and securing of the billion dollars worth US aid to Pakistan in return for the support in the US-led war on terror. Moreover, despite a series of internal and external distresses, economic situation of Pakistan improved significantly and reserves increased to US$10.7bn on 30 June 2004 as compared to US$1.2bn October 1999. Exchange Rate became stable and predictable; the inflation rate dropped to 3.5% last 3 years as against 11–12% in 1990.

After taking control of the economy, Aziz aggressively promoted the privatisation, deregulation and economic liberalisation programme and open the large heavy mechanical industries, petroleum companies, electropetroleum and chemical enterprises and state-owned corporations to private sectors. His tenure as finance minister and prime minister, the agriculture production and construction well increased, whilst aggressively and forcefully implementing his policies to liberalise the trade, and eliminated the non-tariff barriers. Under his regime, the maximum bound tariffs were brought down to high as 300% to 25% whilst the applied tariff averages falls in the range of 5% to 10%.

The GDP growth which was at 3.9% in October 1999, stood between 6.6%—9% and successfully privatised all state-owned corporations and state enterprises before completing his term. However, Aziz's strategy failed deal with underlying problems deeply in country's economy. The global financial crises in 2008 led the sharp drop in the country's economy while an acute electricity shortage in the country revealed the incompetence by the Peoples Party's government, but also the failure of his government to develop the necessary energy infrastructure on time.

Political economists, however, gave other side of story by arguing that his policies were not aimed at alleviating poverty as he seldom offered relief to the poor sections of the society. Shaukat Aziz is roundly criticized for his policy of downsizing in the public sector and disintegrating the effects of nationalization policies of Benazir Bhutto as early as the 1990s but Aziz defended as he points out that his policies made these institutions viable while they were on the verge of collapse. Political economist dr. S. Akbar Zaidi argues that his policies mastered Pakistan's economy but such indicators are misleading and unsustainable because his policies do not examine or explain the particular, perplexing economy of Pakistan.

Image and credentials
A banker and financier by training and extensive experience in the United States, Aziz's credentials are extremely high and considered one of the successful finance minister of Pakistan. His credential records are similar to those of the successful US treasury secretaries such as Bob Rubin and Nicholas F. Brady who did well under Clinton and Reagan administrations. He understands the rôle of banking, finance, investment and consumer credit in economic growth of a nation. Aziz presided the strong banking sector, unprecedented investment and growth finance sectors in Pakistan to underpin its economy. He strengthened capital availability, an essential and increasingly important economic input, in addition to labour and land improvements. With higher education budget up 15-fold and overall education spending up 36% in two years, he focused on education to improve the availability of skilled labour to fill new jobs.

Aziz aggressively pushed land development and public and private construction spending to improve infrastructure and facilities to attract greater business investment. The international communities regarded Aziz as a reformer, with Pakistan's structural reforms ranking high amongst emerging economies. Aziz co-chaired the Secretary-General's High Level Panel on the United Nations System-wide Coherence in the areas of development, humanitarian assistance and the environment. Aziz oversaw the success of the privatisation programme in Pakistan and most of the proceeds so far have come from the telecom and banking sectors, around 80% of Pakistan's banking sector was put under the private hands.

The BBC noted that the privatisation programme, initiated by Nawaz Sharif in 1990, picked up from a jog to a sprint under watchful eyes of Prime Minister Shaukat Aziz. The prime minister is considered the chief architect of privatisation and is widely respected among foreign investors. In an interview with BBC, Aziz mentioned Pakistan's economic growth as he puts it:

In 2008, Aziz participated in the Global Creative Leadership Summit, organised by the Louise Blouin Foundation. As a delegate, he delivered a keynote speech for the panel entitled "Economic Crisis, Economics of Change: Credit, Commodities, and Trade."

Controversies and criticism
In spite of supervising and presiding the successful economic growth at an unprecedent level, his privatisation and energy policies remains extremely controversial in public circles. Critics argued that Aziz's privatisation policies and privatised energy sector did not fully tackle with full force in country's economy. Aziz defended as he points out that his policies made these institutions viable while they were on the verge of collapse.

An unsuccessful attempt to privatise the Pakistan Steel Mills was also thwarted by trade unions and pro-nationalization elements who took the case to Supreme Court of Pakistan in 2006. But Aziz said that his privatisation program produced "the second fastest growing economy in the world."

On 30 October 2011, Aziz directed a letter sent from Dubai to the Provincial Police Office to Balochistan High Court stating "he had been mentioned in the FIR registered at the Dera Bugti Police Station on 13 October 2009, which alleged that then president Pervez Musharraf used him as part of Akbar Bugti case in which the latter committed suicide during a military operation.". Aziz maintained that he was informed of "unfortunate event" through the televised media. Aziz later stated in television that Akbar Bugti died in a military operation during the night of 25/26 August 2008.

On 5 November 2017, Aziz appeared on the Paradise Papers leaks. The leaks claimed that he was linked with the Antarctic Trust, which was set up by Aziz himself. This trust was neither declared by him as prime minister nor as finance minister. Aziz, a former Citibank executive, told the ICIJ he had set the trust up for estate planning purposes and that the funds had come from his employment at Citibank. An internal Appleby document raised concerns about warrants issued for him in connection with the killing of a local leader. Aziz dismissed both the murder charge and the allegations of financial impropriety.

Post-politics
Shaukat Aziz currently resides in West London, United Kingdom. He serves on a number of boards and advisory boards including Millennium & Copthorne Hotels plc. and The Blackstone Group. According to Aziz, he has maintained good relations with several members of his government and the members of the Parliament including his former Foreign Minister Khurshid Kasuri and former railways minister Sheikh Rasheed and his party president Chaudhry Shujaat Hussain. In the midst of 2009, in polls performed by various news agencies, Aziz's approval rating ranged from 30.7%, but ratings dramatically fell down to 17.3% in the end of 2009. In 2012, in polls managed by various news surveys, Aziz's popularity approval ratings ranged at 20.5%. Aziz remained active in political arena of the country and has vigorously defended his financial policies. Aziz criticised the care-taker government of Muhammad Mian Soomro for the economic collapse, and predicted that, "the next elections will sweep, paving the way for a two-party system to emerge with the Pakistan Muslim League in the government and the Peoples Party in the opposition".

He remains active on economic issues and harshly criticised the International Monetary Fund (IMF) of failing to show leadership during what he described as a "historic" global financial crisis. While attending the international business conference at Philippines, Aziz maintained that: "This global institution (IMF) which is supposed to look at everything going on was not even in the room where meetings are going on". In 2008, Aziz gave vehement criticism to IMF and according to him, the "IMF has played a very negative role" in global crises.

Speaking at the Association of Southeast Asian Nations conference in 2008, Aziz maintains his views that the Financial crisis occurred due to financial mismanagement, lack of understanding the macroeconomics principles and fragmented regulatory regimes in the world. In an interview with CNN, Aziz remains pessimistic about Pakistan's approach to Free Trade Agreement with the United States in 2012 based on his judgment of the current relations with the United States and economic challenges faced by the country.

See also
 List of prime ministers of Pakistan
 Government of Shaukat Aziz
 Privatization in Pakistan
 Market corporatisation
 2008 Pakistani parliamentary election

References

External links
 Shaukat Aziz
 Economic Pakistan
 Profile by BBC dated 30 July 2004
 The Turnaround Wizard – Asia Inc. cover story, 4 March 2004
 Asiasource interview  of Shaukat Aziz dated 20 April 2004
 A conversation with Pakistan Prime Minister Shaukat Aziz South China Morning Post dated 28 March 2007
 BOI Pakistan Economic indicators
 Pakistan's Former Prime Minister Defends His Country – The Daily Beast June 7, 2011
 Pakistan, China enjoy multi-faceted relationship: former Pakistani PM – June, 28, 2011

|-

1949 births
Citigroup people
Finance Ministers of Pakistan
Pakistani financiers
Institute of Business Administration, Karachi alumni
Living people
Pakistan Muslim League (Q) MNAs
Pakistani bankers
Pakistani MNAs 2002–2007
St. Patrick's High School, Karachi alumni
Prime Ministers of Pakistan
People of the insurgency in Khyber Pakhtunkhwa
Businesspeople from Karachi
Muhajir people
Politicians from Karachi
Government Gordon College alumni
Pakistani emigrants to the United Kingdom
Naturalised citizens of the United Kingdom
Heads of government who were later imprisoned
People named in the Paradise Papers